The eighth and final season of Monk originally aired in the United States on USA Network from August 7 to December 4, 2009.  It consisted of 16 episodes.  Tony Shalhoub, Traylor Howard, Ted Levine, and Jason Gray-Stanford reprised their roles as the main characters.  A DVD of the season was released on March 16, 2010.

Crew
Andy Breckman continued his tenure as show runner. Executive producers for the season included Breckman, David Hoberman, series star Tony Shalhoub, writer Tom Scharpling, and Rob Thompson.  Universal Media Studios was the primary production company backing the show.  Randy Newman's theme ("It's a Jungle Out There") was continued to be used, while Jeff Beal's original instrumental theme could be heard in some episodes.  Newman also wrote a song for the final episode entitled When I'm Gone.  The song was accompanied by a montage of past and present characters from the show, leading the series into the final end credits.  Directors for the season included Randall Zisk, Michael Zinberg, David Breckman, and Andrei Belgrader.  Dean Parisot returned to direct "Mr. Monk and the Badge".  It was his only credit in the series, apart from the pilot episode.  Writers for the season included Michael Angeli, Andy Breckman, David Breckman, Hy Conrad, Tom Gammill, Dylan Morgan, Max Pross, Salvatore Savo, Josh Siegal, Joe Toplyn, Tom Scharpling, and Peter Wolk.

Cast

All four main characters returned for the final season.  Tony Shalhoub returned as former homicide detective Adrian Monk, with Traylor Howard returning as Monk's faithful assistant, Natalie Teeger.  Ted Levine returned as the SFPD captain, Leland Stottlemeyer, and Jason Gray-Stanford reprised his role as the lovable but oblivious Lieutenant Randy Disher.

Hector Elizondo returned as Monk's new psychiatrist, Dr. Neven Bell.  Emmy Clarke continued to portray Julie Teeger.  Virginia Madsen entered the series as Stottlemeyer's new girlfriend (and later wife), Trudy K. Jensen.  Melora Hardin reprised her role as Trudy Monk (Monk's deceased wife), and Casper Van Dien returned as Lt. Steven Albright, Natalie's new love interest.  Tim Bagley returned to resolve Harold Krenshaw's (Monk's number-one rival) plotline.  Craig T. Nelson entered as Judge Ethan Rickover in the penultimate episode.  D. B. Woodside entered in the same episode as Monk's physician, Dr. Matthew Shuler.  Alona Tal made an appearance in the final episode as Trudy's daughter, Molly Evans.  Bitty Schram made a special appearance as Sharona Fleming, Monk's former nurse (Schram was a former cast member, who left during the third season).  Other guest stars for the eighth season included Brooke Adams, Adewale Akinnuoye-Agbaje, Sarah Aldrich, Dylan Baker, Eric Balfour, Ed Begley, Jr., Jack Betts, Kelly Carlson, Ian Paul Cassidy, Shelly Cole, Vince Curatola, Reed Diamond, Mary Beth Evans, Michael Fairman, Mark Harelik, Jesse Heiman, Carol Kane, Bernie Kopell, Wallace Langham, Meat Loaf, Louis Lombardi, John Carroll Lynch, Jay Malone, Jack McGee, Lex Medlin, Jay Mohr, Elizabeth Perkins, Teri Polo, Sarah Rush, Rena Sofer, Daniel Stern, Eric Stonestreet, Karen Strassman, Jack Wagner, Gary Weeks, Christina Vidal, Chandra West, Wade Williams, and Alex Wolff.

Episodes

Awards and nominations

Emmy Awards
 Primetime Emmy Award for Outstanding Lead Actor - Comedy Series (Tony Shalhoub, nominated)
Primetime Emmy Award for Outstanding Original Music and Lyrics (Randy Newman, won)

Screen Actors Guild
Outstanding Actor – Comedy Series (Tony Shalhoub, nominated)

References

Monk (TV series)
2009 American television seasons
Monk (TV series) seasons